Tobias Is an Angel (French: Tobie est un ange) is a 1940 French comedy film directed by Yves Allégret. The title is a reference to Tobias and the Angel. The film was made at Toulon, then in Vichy France. It is now a lost film.

Cast

References

Bibliography 
 Waldman, Harry. Scenes Unseen: Unreleased and Uncompleted Films from the World's Master Filmmakers, 1912-1990. McFarland, 1991.

External links 
 

1940 films
1940 comedy films
French comedy films
1940s French-language films
Films directed by Yves Allégret
Lost French films
1940 lost films
Lost comedy films
1940s French films